The 114th Rifle Division began service in July 1939 as a standard Red Army rifle division, as part of the pre-war expansion of the Soviet forces. It was stationed on the Svir River front in the autumn of 1941 and had a relatively uneventful war facing the Finns until the Vyborg–Petrozavodsk Offensive began on June 10, 1944, from which point it saw much more active service. As the Finns were leaving the war the division was transferred to 14th Army in the Arctic, from where it helped to defeat and pursue the German forces from Lapland into Norway.

Formation 
The division began forming on July 14, 1939, at Irkutsk in the Transbaikal Military District. On August 16 the division came under the command of Col. Sergei Nikolaievich Devyatov, who would remain in this post until November 3, 1941.

On June 22, 1941, the division was still in that district. Its primary order of battle was as follows:
 363rd Rifle Regiment
 536th Rifle Regiment
 763rd Rifle Regiment
 405th Light Artillery Regiment
 480th Howitzer Regiment
In July, the 114th joined the 36th Army in the same district, but in September was alerted for transfer to the west. It was eventually assigned to the Southern Operations Group of 7th Army in East Karelia, facing the Finnish Army along the front of the Svir River until June 1944. During most of this time it was part of the 4th Rifle Corps. Col. Mikhail Ignatovich Panfilovich took command of the division on November 4, 1941, and he would remain in command for most of the rest of the war, being promoted to Major General on October 16, 1943.

Advance 
On May 15, 1944, General Panfilovich handed his command to Col. Ignatii Alekseevich Moskalev. The Soviet offensive against Finland began on June 10. By the 16th, Marshal Mannerheim had issued orders to give up East Karelia under the weight of the Soviet assault; the Finns gave up their bridgehead south of the Svir on the 18th. The withdrawal went less smoothly than they expected, because 7th Army kept up an aggressive pursuit, crossing the river on either side of Lodeynoye Pole. The 114th distinguished itself in this operation and was later given the honorific «Свирская» (Svir). By June 30 the Finns had been forced out of Petrozavodsk and, two days later, Salmi. On July 26, Col. Nikolai Antonovich Koshchienko took command of the division, which he would lead for the duration of the war.

By August the Soviet forces had driven the Finnish army back to its 1940 borders, and beginning on August 9th the division was moved to the high Arctic, becoming part of 14th Army. It took part in the Petsamo–Kirkenes Offensive along the coast of the Arctic Ocean, driving the German 20th Mountain Army out of northern Finland and into Norway. On October 31, the 114th was recognized for its role in the capture of Petsamo with the award of the Order of the Red Banner. 14th Army continued its attack into Norway past Kirkenes and across the Neiden River. By now, in late October, the army faced very difficult terrain and the Arctic night, and operations were brought to a virtual halt. However, a reconnaissance force of the 114th was sent 116 road kilometres further west into Norway, eventually reaching Tana on November 13, the deepest operation by Soviet forces into that country. The division served the remainder of the war in Arctic, in 14th Army, officially "out of contact with the enemy" after December. At the war's end the soldiers of the 114th held the official title 114-я стрелковая Свирская Краснознамённая дивизия (English: 114th Rifle, Svir, Order of the Red Banner Division).

Postwar 
The division became part of the 131st Rifle Corps at Repola. It disbanded there in 1946.

References

Citations

Bibliography
 
 
  p. 155

External links
Mikhail Ignatevich Panfilovich
Grigorii Andreevich Yekimov
 http://usacac.army.mil/cac2/CGSC/CARL/download/csipubs/Petsamo-KirkenesOperation.pdf

114
Military units and formations established in 1939
Military units and formations disestablished in 1946
Continuation War
Military units and formations awarded the Order of the Red Banner